Manehshan County is in Zanjan province, Iran. The capital of the county is the city of Mah Neshan. At the 2006 census, the county's population was 41,223 in 9,354 households. The following census in 2011 counted 40,312 people in 10,990 households. At the 2016 census, the county's population was 39,425 in 11,935 households.

Administrative divisions

The population history of Mahneshan County's administrative divisions over three consecutive censuses is shown in the following table. The latest census shows two districts, five rural districts, and two cities.

References

 

Counties of Zanjan Province